The Garment Capitol Building is a historic building in Los Angeles. Its developer was Florence Casler. It was designed in the Gothic Revival architectural style by William Douglas Lee, and it was completed in 1926. It has been listed on the National Register of Historic Places since March 8, 2010. It was acquired by developer Naty Saidoff in 2012, who invested US$20 million to restore it.

References

National Register of Historic Places in California
Gothic Revival architecture in California
Buildings and structures completed in 1926
Buildings and structures in Los Angeles